The 1999 All Thailand Golf Tour was the first season of the All Thailand Golf Tour, the main professional golf tour in Thailand.

Schedule
The following table lists official events during the 1999 season.

Notes

References

All Thailand Golf Tour
All Thailand Golf Tour